The Doctor Is In may refer to:

Television episodes 
 "The Doctor Is In" (Big Bad Beetleborgs)
 "The Doctor Is In" (Braceface)
 "The Doctor Is In" (Crash)
 "The Doctor Is In" (Dark Justice)
 "The Doctor Is In" (Everwood)
 "The Doctor Is In" (Ruby)
 "The Doctor Is In" (Rugrats)

Other uses 
 ECW The Doctor is In, a 1996 professional wrestling event promoted by Extreme Championship Wrestling
 "The Doctor Is In", a 2007 story arc in the comics series Sinister Dexter
 The Doctor Is In, a 1977 album by Ben Sidran
 "Doctor Is In", a song by Hoodoo Gurus from Kinky (2005 re-release)
 "The Doctor Is In", a former weekly segment, presented by Lise Van Susteren, of the radio program The Paul Berry Show

See also 
 The Doctor Is In... and Out, a 1974 album by Yusef Lateef
 "The Doctor Is In... Deep", an episode of Melrose Place
 The Doctor Is Out (disambiguation)